Peter L.W. Osnos (born October 13, 1943) is an American journalist who is the founder of PublicAffairs Books.

Early life 
Osnos was born in India to a Jewish refugee family from Warsaw, Poland. He is the son of Joseph Osnos and Marta Osnos, who later settled in New York. Osnos graduated from Brandeis University and the Columbia Graduate School of Journalism.

Career 
In 1965, Osnos began his journalism career as an editorial assistant to investigative journalist I. F. Stone on his weekly newsletter. From 1966 to 1984, Osnos worked for The Washington Post; he was a foreign correspondent in Vietnam, the Soviet Union, and the United Kingdom, and he also served as foreign editor and national editor. Osnos was a regular commentator for National Public Radio's Morning Edition and co-host of Communiqué. In 1984, he joined Random House, where he worked until 1996 as a senior editor, vice president, and associate publisher, and as publisher of the Times Books division. In 1997, he founded PublicAffairs. He served as Publisher and CEO until 2005 and, then, as Consulting Editor until December 31, 2020. Authors he has published or edited include former President Jimmy Carter, Rosalynn Carter, Sid Caesar, Clark Clifford, former President Bill Clinton, Leonard Downie, Jr., Paul Farmer, Earvin (Magic) Johnson, Kareem Abdul Jabbar, Sam Donaldson, Kenneth Feinberg, Annette Gordon Reed, Meg Greenfield, Dorothy Height, Don Hewitt, Molly Ivins, Vernon Jordan, Murray Kempton, Wendy Kopp, Charles Krauthammer, Brian Lamb, Jim Lehrer, Scott McClellan, Robert McNamara, Charles Morris, Peggy Noonan, William Novak, former President Barack Obama, former Speaker of the House Tip O’Neill, Nancy Reagan, Andy Rooney, Morley Safer, Natan Sharansky, George Soros, Susan Swain, former President Donald Trump, Paul Volcker, Juan Williams, James Wolfensohn, former Russian President Boris Yeltsin, and Nobel Peace Prize winner Muhammad Yunus.

From 2006 to 2014, he wrote the Platform column for the Century Foundation, which was published by The Daily Beast and The Atlantic. Since 2017, his Platform column has been published on Medium. In January 2022, Peter Osnos Platform was launched on Substack.

His memoir An Especially Good View: Watching History Happen was published in 2021. He is the editor of a book of biographical essays called George Soros: A Life in Full, coming in March 2022.

He has served on the board of directors of Human Rights Watch, and, from 2005 to 2009, he was executive director of The Caravan Project, a non-profit organization that supported the simultaneous publishing of books in audio, digital, and print formats. He was Vice-Chairman of the Columbia Journalism Review from 2007 to 2012. In 2020, he and his wife Susan co-founded Platform Books LLC.

Personal 
Osnos lives in New York City with his wife Susan Sherer Osnos, who is chair of the board of the Center for Civilians in Conflict. She is a daughter of diplomat Albert W. Sherer Jr. He has two children: Katherine Osnos Sanford and journalist Evan Osnos; and five grandchildren.

Works
 An Especially Good View: Watching History Happen, Platform Books, 2021. ISBN 9781735996806

References

External links

Living people
American male journalists
American people of Polish-Jewish descent
Jewish American journalists
1944 births
Brandeis University alumni
Columbia University Graduate School of Journalism alumni